Cypro may refer to:

 Cyprus (prefix Cypro-), an island country in the Eastern Mediterranean Sea
 Cyproterone acetate, also known as CPA and Androcur, an antiandrogen and progestogen

See also
 Cipro, a trade name for the antibiotic ciprofloxacin